Neigenan is an ancient village located on the Great Salt desert of Iran; it is a village of Boushroyeh city. The oral history of the town dates its foundation back more than 2700 years. Another village with the same name is close to the city of Birjand. The village is reachable via the Iranian national railway, by transit through the city of Tabas.

The two main families in Neigenan are named Soltani and Ghanayee.

Populated places in South Khorasan Province